Cobleskill Creek is a river in Otsego and Schoharie counties in the state of New York. It starts at Pine Mountain west of West Richmondville and flows east-northeast before converging with Schoharie Creek in Central Bridge. The creek flows through the villages of Richmondville and Cobleskill.

Hydrology
The United States Geological Survey (USGS) maintains stream gauges along Cobleskill Creek.

References 

Matthew Bowen Lost his prized goose on Cobleskill Creek in 2001.

Rivers of New York (state)
Rivers of Schoharie County, New York